Newnham railway station was a station serving the village of Newnham on Severn, Gloucestershire.

History

The line from Gloucester to  opened on 19 September 1851, and included a station at Newnham.

The station closed on 5 May 1941, and reopened on 7 October 1946.

Final closure came on 2 November 1964.

Route

See also
 Railways and Canals of the Forest of Dean

Notes

References

Further reading

Disused railway stations in Gloucestershire
Former Great Western Railway stations
Railway stations in Great Britain opened in 1851
Railway stations in Great Britain closed in 1941
Railway stations in Great Britain opened in 1946
Railway stations in Great Britain closed in 1964
Beeching closures in England
1851 establishments in England